Flanders’ DRIVE is a Flemish non-profit organization. The aim of the organization is to support the vehicle suppliers with know-how through the Flanders’ DRIVE Network, and to provide infrastructure for the automotive industry through the Flanders’ DRIVE Engineering Centre. 

In 2014, Flanders DRIVE, Flanders' Mechatronics Technology Centre (FMTC) and laboratories of the 5 Flemish universities merged into Flanders Make.

See also
 Agoria
 Automotive Cluster of Wallonia

External links
 Flanders’ DRIVE
Flanders Make

Organisations based in Belgium
Science and technology in Belgium
Flanders